Bent Sørmo (born 22 September 1996) is a Norwegian footballer who plays as a right-back for First Division A club Zulte Waregem.

Career
Sørmo was born in Levanger. After impressing in his local club Levanger Sørmo was awarded with a contract by Rosenborg in December 2013. He played his first senior game for Rosenborg when starting the Norwegian Football Cup first-round game versus Orkla.

He rejoined Levanger on loan in 2015, and in the summer that year the loan was made permanent. In December 2017 he signed for Kristiansund.

Career statistics

References

External links
 Profile at RBK.no

1996 births
Living people
People from Levanger
Norwegian footballers
Norway youth international footballers
Levanger FK players
Rosenborg BK players
Kristiansund BK players
Eliteserien players
Norwegian First Division players
Norwegian Second Division players
Association football midfielders

Sportspeople from Trøndelag